The Massacre of 1391, also known as the pogroms of 1391, was a display of antisemitism and violence against Jews in Spain. It was one of the Middle Ages' worst antisemitic outbreaks; Jews were ultimately given the choice of converting or leaving Spain in 1492. Jews in the Iberian Peninsula at this time were generally disliked, and violence against them was common even until the 15th century. The year 1391, however, marked a peak of anti-Jewish violence.

Attitudes toward Jews in the 1300s 
In the years leading up to the Massacre of 1391, Jews were not particularly liked by the Catholic church because they were believed to have crucified the Christ. However, there was tolerance as they were under the protection of Spain and had crucial roles in banking and finance that made them a financial asset. In the early fourteenth century (1311–12) the general council of Vienne met and decided to censor the Moors' religious freedoms, and some would claim that the general council became aware of what their neighbors thought of their tolerance of Jews, and therefore returned to Spain with a newfound goal to damage the peaceful tolerance among  Jews, Moors, and larger Spanish population. However, while it is likely that this inspired ill feelings towards Jews, there was no drastic result because of the current tax on the Jewish people which contributed greatly to the kingdom and the church. Thus, Jews were too much of an economic asset to be violently discriminated against.

Violence in the early 1300s 
Peter (Pedro) I (known by his enemies as Peter the Cruel) was the king of Castile from 1350 to 1365. Unlike the norm of abusing Jews financially, Peter was sympathetic to them. Some would explain his Jewish sympathy by claiming that he was illegitimately Jewish himself.

While a rebel against the church, Peter the Cruel had become a sort of protector of Jews against Henry of Trastamara, his half-brother. Henry had killed around 1,200 Jews in 1355, ordered a Jewish massacre in 1360, and was involved in the murder of many other Jews in 1366.  When Peter's half-brother Henry killed him during a battle in a civil war in 1369, Jews lost their royal protection and became the subject of attacks in Castile. They also were greatly taxed. While Henry had criticized his brother for being in support of Jews, he himself became tolerant of them because of the financial burdens placed on them and the services they provided. Because of Henry's violence toward them, the common people of Spain began to accept this violent antisemitism, but Jews were too important financially to be completely annihilated.

The tragedy of 1391 would not have been possible without the Archdeacon of Ecija, Ferrand Martinez, whose actions ignited this tragedy against the Jewish people. Ferrand Martinez was a well-respected and prominent member of the Catholic church, but in his preaching, Martinez would use political anti-Judaism to aid him as he harshly criticized Jews and would stir the people up against them. Martinez would carry his prejudices with him as a religious judge as he would illegally wrong Jews because of his negative feelings toward them. He even went so far as to write to the nearby authorities and command them to remove  Jews from living among them.

The Jews of Seville became greatly concerned with Martinez's orders, so they reached out to the King of Castile. Because of their importance to his finances, Henry sided with Jews in 1378 and told Martinez to stop his persecution of Jews. However, Martinez ignored Henry and continued to preach violence against Jews as he abused his power in the religious judiciary. Jews continued to complain to the king about the injustices against them, and Martinez was warned in 1382, 1383, and 1388 to stop abusing his power and preaching that the king would not punish anyone who attacked or killed Jews.

When Martinez continued to declare his strong beliefs against Jews, the king was once again informed of his harmful actions, but rather than take immediate action, he simply commended Martinez for his religious zeal but also reminded him that Jews were still under the crown's protection. This only fed Martinez as he continued to stir up the people through his harmful sermons against Jews. It wasn't until 1389 that Archbishop Barroso suspended Martinez from both preaching and his judicial position because he had publicly and inaccurately preached on the Pope's power.

While Martinez' suspension did give Jews some relief, it was short lived; in 1390 both Archbishop Barroso and the king died, resulting in Martinez gaining a higher position in the church and his suspension being terminated. Martinez used his newfound position and power to order the Jewish synagogues to be destroyed, the materials used in Catholic churches, and the Jewish books to be sent to him. This destruction and the force used to fulfill it rightly frightened Jews of Seville, who once again reached out to the authorities to protect them from Martinez' oppression. In early 1391, the authorities wrote to the religious leaders in Seville and claimed that they were responsible for electing Martinez in a position of such power and they ordered that he right his wrongdoings to Jews, that he rebuild their synagogues, and that he be removed from his religious position. In response to the crown's orders, Martinez claimed that the crown had no authority over him and that he was subject to only the Catholic church. He ignored his orders to rebuild the synagogues and stop preaching against Jews.

Martinez' refusal to obey the crown's orders only illustrated his zeal for his belief that he was doing the right thing by persecuting Jews, and his followers shared the same zeal because he had been riling them up for so long. As his preaching of violence against Jews continued, so did the uneasiness of the mob as they were anxiously awaiting the opportunity to attack and raid Jews. Around March the mob broke out and plundered and killed Jews, and while they were stopped from even further violence, the antisemitic mob mentality had already spread to nearby cities.

Violence in 1391

Violence in Seville and Castile 
Martinez continued to stir up the people against Jews as he preached that they should be forced to convert to Christianity. Violence finally erupted on 6 June when around 4,000 Jews in Seville were murdered, their houses were attacked and destroyed, and those that weren't killed were terrified into converting in an attempt to not be murdered as well.

The violence against Jews originated in Castile, and acted as a catalyst for further violence against Jews. This pattern of violence continued through over 70 other cities and towns within three months, as city after city followed the example set in Seville and Jews faced either conversion and baptism or death, their homes were attacked, and the authorities did nothing to stop or prevent the violence and pillaging of the Jewish people. As this fanaticism and persecution spread throughout the rest of the kingdom of Castile, there was no accountability held for the murders and sacking of the Jewish houses, and estimations claim that there were 50,000 victims (though it is likely this number was exaggerated).

Violence in Aragon 
This religious mob spread even to Aragon, as the authorities could do nothing to prevent the same pattern of plunder, murder, and fanaticism (although it did not go completely unpunished).

About 100,000 Jews in Aragon converted rather than face death or attempt to flee.

Valencia 
One of the first of the cities the antisemitic violence spread to was the city of Valencia, capital of the Kingdom of Valencia, one of the realms forming the Crown of Aragon.

After the violence in Seville and Castile, on 28 June, Queen Violant of Bar ordered city officials to be especially protective of Jews. However, the situation continued to escalate and in July Prince Martin (King John's brother) was placed in charge of protecting Jews against persecution. Martin had gallows set up outside the Jewish area as a threat to those who would be inclined to attack Jews, extra surveillance for security, and criers would go around proclaiming that Jews were under the crown's protection (although the criers were revoked on 6 July).

The Jews in Valencia were attacked on 9 July. The violence started out with several youths outside the Jewish community shouting that Jews should convert or be killed, and the situation continued to escalate to the point of violence. As a crowd began to gather, they began throwing stones at the guards, and, against Martin's attempts to stop the crowd, they used pipes to break through the walls and forcefully enter the gates of the Jewish community and attack Jews. The Jewish houses were pillaged and they themselves were killed and raped by the angry mob. Prince Martin recorded that nearly 300 Jews had been killed that day and that there weren't Jews left who could have been baptized. Other sources claim around 230 Jews were murdered and many of the remainders were forced to be convert. There were around 2,500 Jews in the community, and only about 200 escaped murder and conversion.

While Martin was quick to state that this violence against Jews could have only been explained as judgment from God, King John was not so willing to give up his sovereignty over his people who had explicitly disobeyed both him and his brother, who was present at the attack trying to prevent it. John told Martin that there must be harsh consequences and that the mob must be brutally punished lest the violence spread and cause harm to more Jews. As punishment, Martin imprisoned several of the attackers and had a man hanged (he had tried to attack Muslims). King John criticized his brother's minimal punishments for such brazen disobedience to the crown, and said that he would have had three to four hundred people killed, but now they must put the law on hold and serve punishment on their own.

Around 11,000 Jews in Valencia converted rather than face death or attempt to flee.

References

Sources
 

1391 in Europe
14th-century massacres
14th century in Spain
Medieval anti-Jewish pogroms
Jewish Spanish history
Massacres in Spain
Antisemitism in Spain